HTK (Hidden Markov Model Toolkit) is a proprietary software toolkit for handling HMMs. It is mainly intended for speech recognition, but has been used in many other pattern recognition applications that employ HMMs, including speech synthesis, character recognition and DNA sequencing.

Originally developed at the Machine Intelligence Laboratory (formerly known as the Speech Vision and Robotics Group) of the Cambridge University Engineering Department (CUED), HTK is now being widely used among researchers who are working on HMMs.

See also
 List of speech recognition software

References
HTK Page in Cambridge University

External links
optimizing HTK features using the TIMIT speech corpus (source code)

Speech recognition software